List of states by population may refer to:

 List of countries and dependencies by population
 List of states and territories of the United States by population
 List of states and union territories of India by population

See also
 Population (disambiguation)